"The Lights and Buzz" is a song by Jack's Mannequin. It was released on November 15, 2005, as a music download exclusively through the iTunes Store. In 2006, the song appeared as a bonus track on the Japanese version of Jack's Mannequin's debut album Everything in Transit, as well as on Kevin and Bean's Super Christmas.

It is the first song frontman Andrew McMahon wrote and recorded after his stem cell transplant in connection with his leukemia diagnosis in late 2005. The song's lyrics are heavily influenced by his recovery from the disease, indicated in lines like "I'm coming home from my hardest year" and "It's good to be alive".

References
  

2005 singles
Jack's Mannequin songs
American Christmas songs
Maverick Records singles
2005 songs
Songs written by Andrew McMahon